Ride the Void is the second album by Heavy Metal band Holy Grail released in 2013 in Europe through Nuclear Blast and in North America through Prosthetic Records

Track listing

Reception

Personnel

Holy Grail
Alex Lee - guitars
James Paul Luna - vocals
Eli Santana - guitars, vocals
Tyler Meahl - drums
Blake Mount - bass

Additional Personnel
Giovanna Maraga Clayton - Cello on "Ride the Void" and "Wake Me When It's Over"
Matt Hyde - Producer, Recording
Mike Bax - Photography
Jessica Luna - Photography
Angela Boatwright - Photography
Jeff McDonough - String orchestration 
Richard Barron	- String arrangements on "Wake Me When It's Over"
Alan Douches - mastering
Chris Rakestraw - engineering
Mark Lewis - mixing
Dylan Cole - cover art

References 

2013 albums
Holy Grail (band) albums
Nuclear Blast albums
Prosthetic Records albums